The 2013 Miami RedHawks football team represented Miami University in the 2013 NCAA Division I FBS football season and finished the season with an  record. They were led by head coach Don Treadwell for the first five then led by interim head coach Mike Bath of their final seven games. They played their home games at Yager Stadium and competed as a member of the East Division of the Mid-American Conference.

After opening the season , head coach Don Treadwell was fired and Mike Bath was named interim head coach. Over his tenure as head coach, Treadwell compiled a record of  since he was hired in 2011.

Schedule

Source: Schedule

References

Miami
College football winless seasons
Miami RedHawks football seasons
Miami RedHawks football